Artur Saładiak (born March 15, 1991) is a Polish Muay Thai kickboxer and Lethwei fighter who competes in Glory and World Lethwei Championship. He is a former WLC Light Middleweight World Champion.

Muay Thai & kickboxing career
Fighting out of FSC Muay Thai in Exeter, Artur Saladiak began his Muay Thai career on the British scene, competing for events like Infinity Full On and Total Takedown.

On September 11, 2016, Saladiak had his first big break when he appeared on THAI FIGHT London facing French Muaythai star Antoine Pinto. He lost the fight by decision after three rounds.

On September 22, 2017, he faced Youssef Boughanem at Phoenix 3 London, where he lost via third-round technical knockout.

On August 22, 2021, Saladiak faced Alex MacGregor at Lion Fight 68 on short notice. He lost by unanimous decision.

Glory
On October 12, 2019, Saladiak made his Glory debut at Glory 69: Düsseldorf. Facing Vlad Tuinov, he lost a three-round unanimous decision.

He returned to Glory at Glory 75: Utrecht on February 29, 2020, where he faced Gueric Billet. In a fight that saw him get knocked down, Saladiak went on to lose via unanimous decision.

Lethwei career

World Lethwei Championship
Artur Saladiak made his Lethwei debut on June 10, 2017, at WLC 2: Ancient Warriors. He defeated Soe Lin Oo of Myanmar by unanimous decision. Saladiak is featured in the Netflix documentary series FightWorld in the episode titled "Myanmar: Crossroads", which is centered around Lethwei.

On June 2, 2018, Saladiak fought Saw Ba Oo at WLC 5: Knockout War for the inaugural WLC Light Middleweight World Championship, knocking out the Burmese fighter in fourth round to become the WLC World Champion.

In 2019, he made his first defense of the WLC Light Middleweight World Championship against up-and-coming Ukrainian fighter Sasha Moisa. On August 2, 2019, at WLC 9: King of Nine Limbs, Saladiak lost to Moisa by unanimous decision and failed to retain the WLC Light Middleweight World Championship.

A1 Federation 
On May 9, 2021, Saladiak defeated Filip Rządek by decision in a three-round bout under Lethwei rules at A1 Federation Gala 6. It was the first-ever Lethwei event held in Poland, sanctioned by the Polish Lethwei Federation and the World Lethwei Federation.

Championships and accomplishments

Muay Thai
 K1 British 84 kg Champion
 ICO British 84 kg Champion 
 2015 Infinity Area 84 kg Champion 
 Golden Belt British Muay Thai 72.5 kg Champion

Lethwei
 World Lethwei Championship
 WLC Light Middleweight World Champion

Lethwei record
 
|- style="background:#cfc;"
| 2021-05-09 || Win || align="left" | Filip Rządek ||  A1 Federation Gala 6 || Pleszew, Poland || Decision || 3 || 3:00
|- style="background:#fbb;"
| 2019-08-02 || Loss || align="left" | Sasha Moisa ||  WLC 9: King of Nine Limbs || Mandalay, Myanmar || Decision (Unanimous) || 5 || 3:00
|-
! style=background:white colspan=9 |
|- style="background:#cfc;"
| 2018-06-02 || Win || align="left" | Saw Ba Oo ||  WLC 5: Knockout War || Naypyidaw, Myanmar || KO || 4 || 1:00
|-
! style=background:white colspan=9 |
|- style="background:#cfc;"
| 2017-11-04 || Win || align="left" | Alex Bublea || WLC 3: Legendary Champions || Yangon, Myanmar || Decision (Unanimous) || 5 || 3:00
|- style="background:#c5d2ea;"
| 2017-08-06 || Draw || align="left" | Soe Lin Oo || Mandalay Rumbling Classic Fight || Mandalay, Myanmar || Draw || 5 || 3:00
|- style="background:#cfc;"
| 2017-06-10 || Win || align="left" | Soe Lin Oo || WLC 2: Ancient Warriors || Yangon, Myanmar || Decision (Unanimous) || 5 || 3:00
|-
| colspan=9 | Legend:

Muay Thai & kickboxing record

|-  style="background:#FFBBBB;"
| 2021-11-27|| Loss ||align=left| Alex Bublea ||  Roar Combat League 22 || Runcorn, England || Decision (Unanimous) || 5 || 3:00
|-  style="background:#FFBBBB;"
| 2021-08-22|| Loss ||align=left| Alex MacGregor ||  |Lion Fight 68 || Glasgow, Scotland || Decision (Unanimous) || 5 || 3:00
|-  style="background:#FFBBBB;"
| 2020-02-29|| Loss ||align=left| Guerric Billet ||  |Glory 75: Utrecht || Utrecht, Netherlands || Decision (Unanimous) || 3 || 3:00
|- style="background:#FFBBBB;"
| 2019-11-09|| Loss || align="left" | Jack Cooper || Muay Thai Grand Prix 30 || London, United Kingdom|| Decision (Unanimous) || 3 || 3:00
|-
! style=background:white colspan=9 |
|- style="background:#FFBBBB;"
| 2019-10-12|| Loss || align="left" | Vlad Tuinov || Glory 69: Düsseldorf || Düsseldorf, Germany|| Decision (Unanimous) || 3 || 3:00
|-  style="background:#CCFFCC;"
| 2019-04-06|| Win ||align=left| Giannis Skordilis || Kickboxing Grand Prix 18 || London, United Kingdom || Decision (Unanimous) || 3 || 3:00
|-  style="background:#c5d2ea;"
| 2018-03-10|| Draw ||align=left| Matt Murdoch || Stand and Bang || United Kingdom || Decision || 3 || 3:00
|-  style="background:#FFBBBB;"
| 2017-09-22|| Loss ||align=left| Youssef Boughanem || Phoenix 3 London || London, United Kingdom || TKO || 3 ||  
|-
! style=background:white colspan=9 |
|-  style="background:#FFBBBB;"
| 2017-02-12|| Loss ||align=left| Josh Turbill || Tanko Muay Thai League || Manchester, United Kingdom || Decision (Unanimous) || 5 || 3:00 
|-  style="background:#CCFFCC;"
| 2016-11-05|| Win ||align=left| Ole Petter Nyback || Fight Nights || London, United Kingdom || TKO || 1 ||
|-  style="background:#FFBBBB;"
| 2016-09-11|| Loss ||align=left| Antoine Pinto || THAI FIGHT London || London, United Kingdom || Decision || 3 || 3:00
|-  style="background:#CCFFCC;"
| 2016-07-11 || Win ||align=left| Dilwyn Jones || The Tankō Main Event || United Kingdom || TKO || 3 ||
|-  style="background:#CCFFCC;"
| 2016-03-19 || Win ||align=left| Jack Sampola || YOKKAO 17 & 18 || Bolton, United Kingdom || TKO || 1 ||
|-  style="background:#CCFFCC;"
| 2015-06-20 || Win ||align=left| Tomasz Czernicki || Infinity Full On: Fired Up || London, United Kingdom || KO || 2 ||
|-  style="background:#CCFFCC;"
| 2015-03-28 || Win ||align=left| Dan Dunn || Total Takedown || United Kingdom || Decision || 3 || 3:00
|-  style="background:#CCFFCC
| 2015-02-28|| Win ||align=left| Dan Curtain || Infinity Full On: Reloaded || London, United Kingdom || KO || 1 ||   
|-
! style=background:white colspan=9 |
|-  style="background:#CCFFCC;"
| 2014-11-01|| Loss ||align=left| Oli Skarlot || Gala K1 || United Kingdom || Decision || 3 || 3:00
|-
| colspan=9 | Legend:

See also
List of male kickboxers

References

External links
 Artur Saladiak at Glory
 Artur Saladiak at World Lethwei Championship
 Facebook page

Polish male kickboxers
Polish Muay Thai practitioners
Polish Lethwei practitioners
Lightweight kickboxers
Middleweight kickboxers
1991 births
Living people
People from Mirosławiec
Glory kickboxers